Ruppert is both a surname and a given name. Notable people with the name include:

Surname
Jacob Ruppert, National Guard colonel, U.S. Representative from New York, brewery owner, owner of the New York Yankees
James Ruppert, responsible for the deadliest shooting inside a private residence in American history
Michael Ruppert, founder and editor of From The Wilderness
Stefan Ruppert, German politician
Wilhelm Ruppert, SS trooper in charge of executions at Dachau concentration camp executed for war crimes

Given name
Ruppert Jones, former Major League Baseball outfielder
Ruppert L. Sargent, United States Army officer and a recipient of the Medal of Honor for his actions in the Vietnam War

See also
Rupert (name)

Surnames from given names